Sanjeewa Gotabhaya Hulangamuwa (27 October 1955 – 17 January 2013), also known as Sanjeewa Hulangamuwa, was a Sri Lankan politician and businessman. He was also UPFA Councillor for Kandy Municipal Council, Insurance Consultant and managing director, Super Insurance Brokers, Kandy. He also served as President of the Kandy Rotary Club, At the time of his death he was serving as the Chairman of the Kandy Municipal Council Sports Committee. Hulangamuwa remained a lifelong bachelor.

Early life
Sanjeewa was born to Alfred and Joyce Hulangamuwa (née Dullewe) in Kandy, Sri Lanka. He had two younger siblings – brother Jayantha Hulangamuwa and sister Thiloni Dissanayake (née Hulangamuwa).  His father Alfred Hulangamuwa was a step-brother of William Gopallawa (First President of Sri Lanka).

Education
He completed his Primary and Secondary education at St. Sylvester's College and Trinity College, Kandy, respectively.

Political career
Hulangamuwa served as UPFA Councillor of Kandy Municipal Council for over two decades from 1991 to 2013, and as district organiser for the Sri Lanka Freedom Party in Kandy District. He was a member of the Council Delegation to Workshop on ‘Coalition of Cities against Discrimination in Asia and the Pacific’ in Bandung, Indonesia. The workshop was organised by the UNESCO.

President pays last respects
Hulangamuwa died of a heart attack on 17 January 2013 at his residence in Kandy. President Mahinda Rajapaksa and several Ministers visited his residence at Damunupola Mawatha on 19 January 2013 to pay their last respects.

See also
List of political families in Sri Lanka

References

External links
 Sanjeewa Hulangamuwa’s last journey

1955 births
2013 deaths
Politicians from Kandy
Alumni of Trinity College, Kandy
Sinhalese businesspeople
Sri Lanka Freedom Party politicians
United People's Freedom Alliance politicians
Gopallawa family
Alumni of St. Sylvester's College